Kalinin is a rural locality (a khutor) in Krasnensky District, Belgorod Oblast, Russia. The population was 23 as of 2010. There is 1 street.

References 

Rural localities in Krasnensky District